Lincoln is a historical provincial electoral division in Ontario, Canada, which was represented in the Legislative Assembly of Ontario between 1867 and 1999.  It was located on the Niagara Peninsula.

At various times, there was also a federal electoral district of the same name represented in the House of Commons.

There was also a Lincoln district used to elect members of the Legislative Assembly of Upper Canada starting  in 1792.

Members of Provincial Parliament

Former provincial electoral districts of Ontario